King Street Bridge may refer to:

 King Street Bridge (Melbourne), Australia
 King Street Bridge (Toronto), Canada
 King Street Overhead Bridge, Kings Mountain, Cleveland County, North Carolina, US